7G-Tronic is Mercedes-Benz's trademark name for its seven-speed automatic transmission, starting off with the W7A 700 and W7A 400 (Wandler-7-Gang-Automatik bis 700 oder 400 Nm Eingangsdrehmoment; converter-7-gear-automatic with 516 or 295 ft·lb maximum input torque; type 722.9) as core models.

Abstract
This fifth-generation transmission was the first seven-speed automatic transmission ever used on a production passenger vehicle. In all applications this transmission is identified as the New Automatic Gearbox Generation Two, or NAG2. It initially debuted in Autumn 2003 on five different eight-cylinder models: the E500, S 430, S 500, CL 500, and SL 500. It also soon became available on many six-cylinder models. Turbocharged V12 engines, four cylinder applications and commercial vehicles continued to use the older Mercedes-Benz 5G-Tronic transmission for many years.

The company claims that the 7G-Tronic is more fuel efficient and has shorter acceleration times and quicker intermediate sprints than the outgoing 5-speed automatic transmission. It has two reverse gear ratios.  

The transmission can skip gears when downshifting. It also has a torque converter lock-up on all seven gears, allowing better transmission of torque for improved acceleration. The transmission's casing is made of magnesium alloy, a first for the industry, to save weight. The 7G-Tronic transmission is built at the Mercedes-Benz Stuttgart-Untertuerkheim plant in Germany, the site of Daimler-Benz's original production facility.

About 65 percent of Mercedes-Benz C-Class sedans, wagons, and sport coupes are purchased with automatic transmissions (with that figure rising). However, about 88 percent of Mercedes-Benz E-Class sedans and wagons are purchased with automatic transmissions, and automatic transmissions are standard on the Mercedes-Benz S-Class.

The transmission is currently available on the SsangYong's vehicles like Rexton, and Korando Turismo (in South Korea)/Turismo (in UK). In July 2009, Mercedes-Benz announced they are working on a new nine-speed automatic.

Specifications

Basic concept
Progress is reflected in 7 forward gears out of 11 main components, compared to 5 forward gears out of 9 main components. This turns out the design as advanced compared to its predecessor but less economical compared to its competitors. It uses no bands nor sprag clutches. It is fully electronic controlled. Torque converter lock-up can operate in all 7 forward gears.

Gear ratios

Gears functionality
In normal condition it sequentially shift gears, but if required it can skip some gears, that are: 7 to 5, 6 to 2, 5 to 3 and 3 to 1.

For 6 or 8 cylinder gasoline engines and if sport mode is not selected, transmission will start in 2nd gear. Also, if it is an offroad vehicle, if low range is selected, it will start in 2nd gear too.

If emergency mode is activated, like when an electric fault or another critical fault occurs, the 6th gear is selected by default (all solenoids off).

AMG SpeedShift

AMG SpeedShift TCT
The TCT transmission is essentially the 7G-Tronic automatic transmission including "Torque Converter Technology".

Sporty, performance-oriented version with the same gear ratios. First used in 2005 Mercedes-Benz SLK 55 AMG.

In 2007, 7G-Tronic transmission with AMG SPEEDSHIFT was also called '7G-Tronic Sport'.

AMG SpeedShift MCT
Mercedes-AMG developed the 7-speed MCT "Multi Clutch Technology" planetary automatic transmission.

The MCT transmission is essentially the 7G-Tronic automatic transmission without a torque converter. Instead of a torque converter, it uses a compact wet startup clutch to launch the car from a stop and also supports computer-controlled double-clutching. The MCT (Multi-Clutch Technology) acronym refers to a planetary (automatic) transmission's multiple clutches and bands for each gear.

The MCT is fitted with four drive modes: “C” (Comfort), “S” (Sport), “S+” (Sport plus) and “M” (Manual) and boasts 100 millisecond shifts in "M" and "S+" modes. MCT-equipped cars are also fitted with the new AMG DRIVE UNIT with an innovative Race Start function. The AMG DRIVE UNIT is the central control unit for the AMG SPEEDSHIFT MCT 7-speed sports transmission and all driving dynamics functions. The driver can change gears either using the selector lever or by nudging the steering-wheel shift paddles. The new Race start Function is a launch control system that enables the driver to call on maximum acceleration while ensuring optimum traction of the driven wheels.

It is available on the 2009 SL 63 AMG and E63 AMG, and will be used for the 2011 S 63 AMG and CL 63 AMG, and the 2012 CLS 63 AMG and C 63 AMG.

Compulsory on the 2014 AMG CLS63 and E63 models, as well as their "S--Model" variants. Improved with the release of the 2015 model year, by decreasing the lag time between shifts.

Applications

Mercedes models

Mercedes C-Class
 2011–2018 Mercedes-Benz W204 (c63AMG, c63AMG Black Series)
 2014 Mercedes-Benz W205 (c180)

Mercedes E-Class
 2009–2016 Mercedes-Benz W212 (E200AMG 7G-Tronic,E63AMG)
 2009–2013 Mercedes-Benz W212 (E200AMG 7G-Tronic)

Mercedes S-Class
 2013–2017 Mercedes-Benz W222 (all models except Maybach S 500 and Maybach S 500 4MATIC)
 2017–2020 Mercedes-Benz W222 (V12 models only)

Mercedes SLK-Class
 2011–2015 Mercedes-Benz R172

Non Mercedes-Benz models

Infiniti
 2014–2019 Infiniti Q50 (2.0t (M274 DE20 LA)).
 2015–2016 Infiniti Q50 (2.2d (OM651 22 LA)).
 2017–2018 Infiniti Q60 (2.0t (M274 DE20 LA) ).

SsangYong Motor
 2017–2020 SsangYong Rexton G4 (2.2 e-XDi turbodiesel)

See also
List of Daimler AG transmissions

Notes

References

External links
7g-Tronic ECU Repair
GermanCarFans

ATT24 GmbH

 

Mercedes-Benz
Automatic transmission tradenames
Mercedes-Benz Group transmissions